Plotnikovia is a Zoological name in need of resolution.

It may be:
 A monotypic genus of central Asian grasshoppers in the subfamily Conophyminae; described by Umnov in 1930 and containing the species Plotnikovia lanigera.
 It has also been described as a genus of marine worms in the Opisthorchiidae; described by Skrjabin in 1945 and containing the species Plotnikovia fodiens.

They cannot both be right.

References